Cuthbert is a surname. Notable people with the surname include:
Alan Cuthbert, a member of the Royal Company of Archers
Alan William Cuthbert (1932–2016), a British pharmacologist and fellow of University College London
Alfred Cuthbert (1785–1856), United States Representative and Senator from Georgia
Betty Cuthbert (1938–2017), Australian athlete
Charles Cuthbert, American architect of Kansas
Cheslor Cuthbert, baseball player
Chris Cuthbert (born 1957), Canadian sportscaster
Dylan Cuthbert, British programmer
Elisha Cuthbert (born 1982), Canadian actress
Erin Cuthbert (born 1998), Scottish footballer
Frederick Alexander Cuthbert (1902-1978), Landscape Architect
Grace Cuthbert MBE (1900 – 1988), Australian doctor and Director of Maternal and Baby Welfare
Jack Cuthbert (born 1987), English rugby union player
Jeffrey Cuthbert (born 1948), Welsh politician, member of the National Assembly of Wales
John Cuthbert (Royal Navy officer) (1902-1987), vice admiral
Josh Cuthbert, English singer (Union J)
Juliet Cuthbert (born 1964), Jamaican runner, primarily in the sprints
Mike Cuthbert, host of AARP's Prime Time Radio show
Ross Cuthbert (politician) (1776–1861), Canadian writer, lawyer and politician
Scott Cuthbert (born 1987), Scottish footballer

Fictional characters:
Marilla and Matthew Cuthbert, from Anne of Green Gables